In Chinese philosophy, Taiji or Tai chi is a cosmological term for the "Supreme Ultimate" state of the world and affairs - the interaction of matter and space, the relation of the body and mind. While Wuji is undifferentiated, timeless, absolute, infinite potential -- Taiji is differentiated, dualistic, and relative. Yin and Yang originate from Wuji to become Taiji. Compared with Wuji (meaning 'without limit'), Taiji describes movement and change wherein limits do arise. Wuji is often translated "no pole" (no polarity, no opposite). Taiji is often translated "polar", with polarity, revealing opposing features as in hot/cold, up/down, dry/wet, day/night.

The term Taiji and its other spelling T'ai chi (using Wade–Giles as opposed to pinyin) are most commonly used in the West to refer to Taijiquan (or T'ai chi ch'uan), an internal martial art, Chinese meditation system and health practice. This article, however, refers only to the use of the term in Chinese philosophy and in Confucianism, Taoism and Buddhism.

Etymology 
Taiji is a compound of tai  "great; grand; supreme; extreme; very; too" (a superlative variant of da  "big; large; great; very") and ji  "pole; roof ridge; highest/utmost point; extreme; earth's pole; reach the end; attain; exhaust". In analogy with the figurative meanings of English pole, Chinese ji  "ridgepole" can mean "geographical pole; direction" (e.g., siji  "four corners of the earth; world's end"), "magnetic pole" (Beiji  "North Pole" or yinji  "negative pole; cathode"), or "celestial pole" (baji  "farthest points of the universe; remotest place"). Combining the two words,  means "the source, the beginning of the world".

Common English translations of the cosmological Taiji are the "Supreme Ultimate" (Le Blanc 1985, Zhang and Ryden 2002) or "Great Ultimate" (Chen 1989, Robinet 2008); but other versions are the "Supreme Pole" (Needham and Ronan 1978), "Great Absolute", or "Supreme Polarity" (Adler 1999).

In Chinese texts

Taiji references are found in Chinese classic texts associated with many schools of Chinese philosophy.

Zhang and Ryden explain the ontological necessity of Taiji.
Any philosophy that asserts two elements such as the yin-yang of Chinese philosophy will also look for a term to reconcile the two, to ensure that both belong to the same sphere of discourse. The term 'supreme ultimate' performs this role in the philosophy of the Book of Changes. In the Song dynasty it became a metaphysical term on a par with the Way. (2002:179)

Zhuangzi 

The Daoist classic Zhuangzi introduced the Taiji concept. One of the (ca. 3rd century BCE) "Inner Chapters" contrasts Taiji  "great ultimate" (tr. "zenith") and Liuji  "six ultimates; six cardinal directions" (tr. "nadir").
The Way has attributes and evidence, but it has no action and no form. It may be transmitted but cannot be received. It may be apprehended but cannot be seen. From the root, from the stock, before there was heaven or earth, for all eternity truly has it existed. It inspirits demons and gods, gives birth to heaven and earth. It lies above the zenith but is not high; it lies beneath the nadir but is not deep. It is prior to heaven and earth, but is not ancient; it is senior to high antiquity, but it is not old. (tr. Mair 1994:55)

Huainanzi 
The (2nd century BCE) confucianist and daoist Huainanzi mentions a Zhenren "true person; perfected person" and the Taiji "Supreme Ultimate" that transcends categories like yin and yang, exemplified with the yinyang fusui and fangzhu mirrors.
The fu-sui  (burning mirror) gathers fire energy from the sun; the fang-chu  (moon mirror) gathers dew from the moon. What are [contained] between Heaven and Earth, even an expert calculator cannot compute their number. Thus, though the hand can handle and examine extremely small things, it cannot lay hold of the brightness [of the sun and moon]. Were it within the grasp of one's hand (within one's power) to gather [things within] one category from the Supreme Ultimate (t'ai-chi ) above, one could immediately produce both fire and water. This is because Yin and Yang share a common ch'i and move each other. (tr. Le Blanc 1985:120-1)

I Ching 
Taiji also appears in the Ten Wings, as in the Xìcí  "Appended Judgments" commentary to the I Ching, a late section traditionally attributed to Confucius but more likely dating to about the 3rd century B.C.E.
Therefore there is in the Changes the Great Primal Beginning. This generates the two primary forces. The two primary forces generate the four images. The four images generate the eight trigrams. The eight trigrams determine good fortune and misfortune. Good fortune and misfortune create the great field of action. (tr. Wilhelm and Baynes 1967:318-9) 
This sequence of powers of two includes Taiji → Yin-yang (two polarities) → Sixiang (Four Symbols) → Bagua (eight trigrams).

Richard Wilhelm and Cary F. Baynes explain.
The fundamental postulate is the "great primal beginning" of all that exists, t'ai chi – in its original meaning, the "ridgepole". Later Indian philosophers devoted much thought to this idea of a primal beginning. A still earlier beginning, wu chi, was represented by the symbol of a circle. Under this conception, t'ai chi was represented by the circle divided into the light and the dark, yang and yin, . This symbol has also played a significant part in India and Europe. However, speculations of a Gnostic-dualistic character are foreign to the original thought of the I Ching; what it posits is simply the ridgepole, the line. With this line, which in itself represents oneness, duality comes into the world, for the line at the same time posits an above and a below, a right and left, front and back – in a word, the world of the opposites. (1967:lv)

Taijitu shuo 

The Song Dynasty philosopher Zhou Dunyi (1017-1073 CE) wrote the Taijitu shuo  "Explanation of the Diagram of the Supreme Ultimate", which became the cornerstone of Neo-Confucianist cosmology. His brief text synthesized aspects of Chinese Buddhism and Daoism with metaphysical discussions in the I ching.

Zhou's key terms Wuji and Taiji appear in the opening line , which Adler notes could also be translated "The Supreme Polarity that is Non-Polar!".
Non-polar (wuji) and yet Supreme Polarity (taiji)! The Supreme Polarity in activity generates yang; yet at the limit of activity it is still. In stillness it generates yin; yet at the limit of stillness it is also active. Activity and stillness alternate; each is the basis of the other. In distinguishing yin and yang, the Two Modes are thereby established. The alternation and combination of yang and yin generate water, fire, wood, metal, and earth. With these five [phases of] qi harmoniously arranged, the Four Seasons proceed through them. The Five Phases are simply yin and yang; yin and yang are simply the Supreme Polarity; the Supreme Polarity is fundamentally Non-polar. [Yet] in the generation of the Five Phases, each one has its nature. (tr. Adler 1999:673-4) 
Instead of usual Taiji translations "Supreme Ultimate" or "Supreme Pole", Adler uses "Supreme Polarity" (see Robinet 1990) because Zhu Xi describes it as the alternating principle of yin and yang, and ...
insists that taiji is not a thing (hence "Supreme Pole" will not do). Thus, for both Zhou and Zhu, taiji is the yin-yang principle of bipolarity, which is the most fundamental ordering principle, the cosmic "first principle." Wuji as "non-polar" follows from this.

Core concept 

Taiji is understood to be the highest conceivable principle, that from which existence flows. This is very similar to the Daoist idea "reversal is the movement of the Dao". The "supreme ultimate" creates yang and yin: movement generates yang; when its activity reaches its limit, it becomes tranquil. Through tranquility the supreme ultimate generates yin. When tranquility has reached its limit, there is a return to movement. Movement and tranquility, in alternation, become each the source of the other. The distinction between the yin and yang is determined and the two forms (that is, the yin and yang) stand revealed. By the transformations of the yang and the union of the yin, the 5 elements (Qi) of water, fire, wood, metal and earth are produced. These 5 Qi become diffused, which creates harmony. Once there is harmony the 4 seasons can occur.  Yin and yang produced all things, and these in their turn produce and reproduce, this makes these processes never ending. (Wu, 1986)
Taiji underlies the practical Taijiquan (T'ai Chi Ch'uan) – A Chinese internal martial art based on the principles of Yin and Yang and Taoist philosophy, and devoted to internal energetic and physical training. Taijiquan is represented by five family styles: Chen, Yang, Wu(Hao), Wu, and Sun. There are also several offshoots of the five families as well as more recent simplified and combined styles for competition.

See also 

Bagua
 National and regional symbols which contain a Taiji mark
 Flag of Mongolia
 Flag of Tibet
 Taegeuk – Sino-Korean pronunciation for Taiji
 Flag of South Korea
 Emblem of South Korea
 Taijitu
 Tomoe
 Absolute (philosophy)
 Ohr

References

Citations

Sources 

 
 
 
 

 

 
 
 
 

Chinese philosophy
Chinese culture
Chinese words and phrases
Taoist cosmology
Tai chi
Neo-Confucianism
Eastern esotericism